The World Between Us is a 2019 Taiwanese television series written by Lu Shih Yuan and directed by Lin Chun Yang. The series follows the aftermath of a mass shooting at a movie theatre and the fates of all involved: the killer, the victims, the victims' families, the media, and the legal defense team. Contemporary Taiwanese social issues are explored, such as the death penalty, mental health stigmas, journalism ethics, and media sensationalism.

The series stars Alyssa Chia, Wu Kang Ren, James Wen, Tracy Chou, Pets Tseng, Chen Yuu and JC Lin. The World Between Us is produced jointly by the Public Television Service, HBO Asia and CatchPlay. The series premiered in Taiwan on March 24, 2019 and consists of 10 episodes. The series is available in Mandarin with English subtitles.

Synopsis 
Wang She (Wu Kang Ren) is a defense attorney whose desire to serve society's marginalized, including defending the shooter, has strained his young growing family. Li Ta-Chih (Chen Yuu) is a young woman working at a TV news station and the sister of theatre shooter, Li Hsiao Ming (Wang Ko Yuan). She has changed her name to escape the stigma of her brother's crime. Ta-Chih's boss, an ambitious woman named Sung Chiao An (Alyssa Chia), lost her son in the theatre shooting. Laden with guilt over her son’s death, Chiao An lashes out at both her employees and her husband, Liu Chao Kuo (James Wen), a newspaper journalist. Wang She enlists Chao Kuo to investigate Hsiao Ming's true motive for the shooting.

Cast

 Alyssa Chia as Sung Chiao An
 Wu Kang Ren as Wang She
 James Wen as Liu Chao Kuo 
 Tracy Chou as Ting Mei Mei
 Pets Tseng as Ying Ssu Yueh
 Chen Yuu as Li Ta-Chih (Li Hsiao Wen)
 Monica Tsai as young Hsiao Wen
 JC Lin as Ying Ssu Tsung
 Shih Ming Shuai as Lin Yi Chun
 Allison Lin as Sung Chiao Ping
 Honduras as Liao Niu Shih
 Hsieh Chiung Hsuan as Mrs. Li
 Chang Chien as Mr. Li
 Amanda Fan as Ah Ling
 Ho Yu Tien as Ah She
 Chien Chi Feng as Side Judge
 Yao Hsiao as Mrs. Ting
 Hsu Hao Hsiang as Chief of Society Division
 Lin Chen Hsi as Wang Fei (Hsiao Fei)
 Crystal Lin as Hsiao Ching
 Lin Hsin Hui as Clerk
 Lin You Lun as Liu Tien Yen
 Lu Shih Yuan as Judge
 Ba Ge as Mr. Ting
 Sheng Chu Ju as Tzeng Ching Chuan
 Tsai Pei Li as Hsiao A
 Tsai Yi Cheng as Interpreter
 Ryan Tu as Presiding Judge
 Wang Ko Yuan as Li Hsiao Ming
 Tsai Jui Tse as young Hsiao Ming
 Rose Yu as Liu Tien Ching

Production
Lu Shih Yuan (Dear Ex and Long Day's Journey into Night) was hired as its screenwriter. In interviews with Taiwanese media, Lu described how she and the other creators of the series analyzed mountains of data from sources such as PTT, Taiwan's equivalent to Reddit, to understand themes of interest. After observing the public's reaction to the 2016 "Little Light Bulb Incident" in Taiwan, in which a young girl nicknamed "Little Light Bulb" was beheaded publicly on the street by a troubled individual suffering from schizophrenia, she narrowed down the premise and spoke with numerous human rights lawyers, judges, and psychiatrists to form the plot. She lamented that Taiwan lagged behind other democracies like Japan and Norway in producing socially realistic dramas and wanted to help Taiwan in this regard.

Themes

Mental health and the justice system 
Attorney Wang She repeatedly discusses how Taiwan’s legal system should have more empathy for the mentally ill and respect international human rights standards. This example and the topic of journalism ethics are unprecedented themes for mainstream Mandarin-language TV.

Journalism ethics 
Taiwan’s National Communications Commission censures Sung Chiao An's news program, creating a discussion about ethics in journalism and how media outlets must balance increasing viewership with reporting integrity.

Human nature 
The show’s Chinese title 我們與惡的距離, translating to “the distance between ourselves and evil,” captures the main source of angst in the series. Each character struggles with their proximity to "evil", either as victims, enablers, or individuals who, had they made slightly different choices, might have ended up as perpetrators themselves. The show reminds viewers that “evil” and “good” are shades of gray rather than black and white. This level of nuanced moral exploration is another novelty for Taiwanese dramas and Mandarin-language television at large.

Reception
On Chinese review website Douban, the series obtained a score of 9.5 out of 10. In April 2019  television series entered the top 50 popular topics of the multilingual Wikipedia.

Awards and nominations

References

External links

 The World Between Us PTS Official Website 
 The World Between Us HBO Asia Official Website
 
 
 
 

2019 Taiwanese television series debuts
2019 Taiwanese television series endings
Public Television Service original programming
HBO Asia original programming
Fictional portrayals of schizophrenia
Television series about journalism
Television stations in fiction